The Paterson Public Schools (PPS) is a comprehensive community public school district that serves students in pre-kindergarten through twelfth grade from Paterson, New Jersey, United States. The district is one of 31 former Abbott districts statewide that were established pursuant to the decision by the New Jersey Supreme Court in Abbott v. Burke which are now referred to as "SDA Districts" based on the requirement for the state to cover all costs for school building and renovation projects in these districts under the supervision of the New Jersey Schools Development Authority.

As of the 2020–21 school year, the district, comprised of 50 schools, had an enrollment of 25,937 students and 1,916.0 classroom teachers (on an FTE basis), for a student–teacher ratio of 13.5:1. For the 2014–15 school year, the district anticipated a budget with total expenditures of $591 million and per pupil spending of $16,696.

The district is classified by the New Jersey Department of Education as being in District Factor Group "A", the lowest of eight groupings. District Factor Groups organize districts statewide to allow comparison by common socioeconomic characteristics of the local districts. From lowest socioeconomic status to highest, the categories are A, B, CD, DE, FG, GH, I and J.

Among the 594 students who took the SAT in 2013, the mean combined score was 1120 and there were 19 students (3.2% of those taking the exam) who achieved the combined score of 1550 that the College Board considers an indicator of college readiness, a decline from the 26 students (4.3%) who achieved the standard the previous year.

District enrollment in Paterson surged at the start of the 2015–16 school year, creating a public school enrollment of 700 students higher than expected and putting the school district in a situation of needing to hire teachers rapidly not long after the district had laid off 300 positions.

State intervention

The district is one of three districts in New Jersey (along with Newark Public Schools and Jersey City Public Schools) under "state intervention", which authorizes the Commissioner of Education to intervene in governance of a local public school district (and to intervene in the areas of instruction and program, operations, personnel, and fiscal management) if the Commissioner has determined that a school district failed or was unable to take corrective actions necessary to establish a thorough and efficient system of education.

Schools
Schools in the district (with 2020–21 enrollment data from the National Center for Education Statistics) are:
Elementary schools
Renaissance One School of Humanities / School 1 (K-5; 234)
School 2 (K-8; 491)
School 3 (K-8; 329)
Dr. Frank Napier Jr. School of Technology #4 (1–8; 548)
School 5 (K-6; 744)
Senator Frank R. Lautenberg School / School 6 (PreK-8; 626)
School 7 (5–8; 744)
School 8 (K-8; 461)
Charles J. Riley / School 9 (PreK-8; 736)
School 10 (K-8; 537)
Newcomers Program / School 11 (3-10; 191)
School 12 (K-8; 546)
School 13 (K-8; 536)
School 14 (closed)
Full Service Community School / School 15 (PreK-5; 519)
School 16 (PreK-8; 850)
School 18 (1-8; 740)
School 19 (K-4; 360)
School 20 (K-8; 431)
School 21 (PreK-8; 694)
Fine & Performing Arts Program / School 24 (PreK-8; 712)
School 25 (K-8; 596)
School 26 (K-8; 522)
School 27 (K-5; 633)
School 28 (PreK-8; 466)
School 29 (K-4; 311)
Dale Avenue School (PreK-2; 243)
Anna Iandoli Early Learning Center (PreK; 77)
Edward W. Kilpatrick School (PreK-3; 347)
Dr. Martin Luther King Jr. Educational Complex (K-8; 603)
New Roberto Clemente School (6–8; 471)
Norman S. Weir School (K-8; 292)
Roberto Clemente School (K-5; 301)
Dr. Hani Awadallah School (PreK-8; 598)

Elementary academies
Alexander Hamilton Academy (K-8; 525)
Joseph A. Taub School (formerly Don Bosco Academy) (6–8; 833)
Paterson Academy for the Gifted and Talented (NA)
Young Men's Leadership Academy (3-8; 73)

High schools
Eastside Educational Complex
School of Culinary Arts, Hospitality and Tourism @ Eastside (9–12; 633)
School of Government and Public Administration @ Eastside (9–12; 695)
School of Information Technology @ Eastside (9–12; 657)
International High School (9–12; 481)
John F. Kennedy Educational Complex
School of Architecture and Construction Trades @ JFK (ACT) (9–12; 583)
School of Business, Technology, Marketing and Finance @ JFK (BTMF) (9–12; 627)
School of Education and Training @ JFK (SET) (9–12; 466)
School of Science, Technology, Engineering and Mathematics (STEM) (9–12; 625)
Rosa L. Parks School of Fine and Performing Arts (9–12; 238)
Garrett Morgan Academy (183; 9-12)
Panther Academy – Academy of Earth and Space Science (9–12; 215)
HARP Academy (9–12; 298)
Students Transitioning and Achieving Real Success (STARS) (9-12; 108)

Other
Alozno "Tambua" Moody Academy / School 11 (NA)

Paterson Adult & Continuing Education (PACE) Adult High School or G.E.D. (NA)
Silk City Academy (NA)

Destiny Academy

Administration

Core members of the district's administration are:
Eileen F. Shafer, Acting State District Superintendent of Schools
Daisy Ayala, Business Administrator / Board Secretary

Governor of New Jersey Jon Corzine announced in March 2009 that he was recommending the appointment of Evans as the district's superintendent, with the State Board of Education ratifying the nomination of Evans by Lucille Davy, Commissioner  of the New Jersey Department of Education.

Board of education
The district's board of education, comprised of nine members, sets policy and oversees the fiscal and educational operation of the district through its administration. As a Type II school district, the board's trustees are elected directly by voters to serve three-year terms of office on a staggered basis, with three seats up for election each year held (since 2014) as part of the November general election. The board appoints a superintendent to oversee the district's day-to-day operations and a business administrator to supervise the business functions of the district.

The district voted in September 2013 voted by a 5-4 margin to move school elections from April to November. An attempt by members of the Paterson City Council in January 2022 to shift elections back to April failed after the vote ended in a 4-4 tie.

References

External links

 Paterson Public Schools
 
School Data for the Paterson Public Schools, National Center for Education Statistics

Education in Paterson, New Jersey
New Jersey Abbott Districts
New Jersey District Factor Group A
School districts in Passaic County, New Jersey